Baktar may refer to:
 Baktar-e Olya
 Baktar-e Sofla